Sidney Udenfriend (April 5, 1918 – December 29, 1999) was an American biochemist, pharmacologist, founding director of the Roche Institute of Molecular Biology, co-discoverer of a color test to detect an intestinal tumor often linked with diseased heart valves.

Udenfriend was also a member of the National Academy of Sciences,
a recipient of the Ames Award, Hillebrand Award, the Arthur S. Flemming award,
Gairdner Award, the Van Slyke Award
chief of the laboratory in the National Heart Institute,
He was also a member  the American Chemical Society, the American Society of Biological Chemists, American Society for Pharmacology and Experimental Therapeutics, and American Association for the Advancement of Science.

Life and career 
 April 5, 1918: born Brooklyn, New York
 1939: graduated from City College of New York
 1942: M.S., New York University
 1948: Ph.D, New York University
 1967: the Van Slyke Award
 1967: Gairdner Foundation International Award
 1969: The Ames Award
 December 29, 1999: died

References 

1918 births
2001 deaths
American pharmacologists
New York University alumni
Members of the United States National Academy of Sciences
People from Brooklyn
Scientists from New York (state)